Matthias Lehmann (born 28 May 1983) is a German former professional footballer who played as a midfielder.

Career

SSV Ulm
Born in Ulm, Lehmann started his career with SSV Ulm 1846 in the 2000–01 season. He made four appearances, against Rot-Weiß Oberhausen, FC St. Pauli, LR Aalen, and Waldhof Mannheim in the 2. Bundesliga.

VfB Stuttgart
Lehmann moved to VfB Stuttgart II where he scored a goal in 24 league appearances and made a German Cup appearance against Greuther Fürth during the 2001–02 season. Stuttgart II finished in 16th place in the Regionalliga Süd and were relegated.

1860 Munich
Lehmann joined 1860 Munich for the 2003–04 season. In his first season, he scored a goal in 17 league appearances. 1860 Munich finished the season in 18th place in the Bundesliga and were relegated. He went on to score six goals in 34 appearances during the 2004–05 season and six goals in 35 appearances during the 2005–06 season.

Alemannia Aachen
Lehmann moved to Alemannia Aachen for the 2006–07 season. In his first season with the club, he scored three goals in 34 appearances in all competitions. He also made an appearance for the reserve team. He went on to score seven goals in 69 appearances in the 2007–08 and 2008–09 seasons.

FC St. Pauli
Lehmann spent the 2009–10 and 2010–11 seasons with FC St. Pauli. He scored eight goals in 35 appearances in all competitions in his first season and five goals in 34 appearances in all competitions in his second season.

Eintracht Frankfurt
In June 2011, Lehmann joined Eintracht Frankfurt, reportedly signing a three-year contract while Eintracht Frankfurt paid St. Pauli a fixed transfer fee of €500,000.
He made 26 league appearances and two in the DFB-Pokal.

1. FC Köln
In June 2012, Lehmann signed for 1. FC Köln. In his first season, he made 29 appearances in all competitions without scoring a goal. He went on to make 26 appearances without scoring the following season. During the 2014–15 season, he scored five goals in 32 league appearances including three goals in four appearances. During the 2015–16 season, he has made five appearances without scoring. Having risen to the captaincy, Lehmann spent seven seasons at Köln. At the end of the 2018-19 season, it was announced that Lehmann would end his career at the club. He played his last career game on 19 May 2019 against FC Magdeburg.

International career
Lehmann was a youth international for Germany.

Career statistics

References

External links
 
 Matthias Lehmann Interview

1983 births
Living people
Association football midfielders
German footballers
Bundesliga players
2. Bundesliga players
SSV Ulm 1846 players
VfB Stuttgart II players
TSV 1860 Munich players
Alemannia Aachen players
FC St. Pauli players
Eintracht Frankfurt players
1. FC Köln players
Germany under-21 international footballers
Germany youth international footballers
Sportspeople from Ulm
Footballers from Baden-Württemberg